Kaptipada estate was one of the princely states of India during the period of the British Raj. It was located in eastern India and  surrounded by Mayurbhanj state in north and west, Nilgiri state in east and Keonjhar state in south. The state was founded by Naga Chief Phanimukuta during the rule of Gajapati ruler Kapileswar Dev about the middle of 15th century A.D.

Rulers

Headquartered at Kainsari 
1. Naga Chief Phanimukta (founder of the state)

2. Vasanta Virata (Gajapati Purushottam Dev awarded "Jaya Bhujanga" title)

3. Ajay Kumar Abhinava Bhujanga

4. Niladwaja Kumar Parikshita Bhujanga

Headquartered at Kaptipada 
1. Sarat Chandra Bhujanga

2-27. (There are 27 ruler ruled the state, but no reliable data available)

28. Nrusimha Charan Mandata

29. Rama Chandra Mandata

30. Abhinava Bhujanga Pitambara Mandata

31. Parikshita Bhujanga Birabara Mandata

32. Jaya Bhujanga Divyaaimha Mandata

33. Virata Bhujanga Goura Chandra Mandata

34. Rajat Chandra Abhinava Bhujanga

35. Pramoda Chandra Parikshita Bhujanga

Reference

Bibliography